Switzerland was represented by Peter, Sue and Marc with the song "Io senza te" at the 1981 Eurovision Song Contest which took place on 4 April. The group were the winners of the Swiss national final for the 1981 contest, held on 21 February.

Before Eurovision

Concours Eurovision 1981 
Swiss French broadcaster TSR was in charge of broadcasting the selection for the Swiss entry for the 1981 Contest. The final was held at the Geneva Palladium in Geneva, hosted by Jean-Pierre Pastori. Six songs were submitted for the 1981 national final and the winning song was chosen by 3 regional juries (DRS, TSR, TSI), plus a press jury and a jury of experts. 

Other participants included future Swiss representative Mariella Farré (1983 and 1985)

At Eurovision
On the night of the contest the group performed nineteenth, following Cyprus and preceding Sweden. At the close of voting "Io senza te" picked up 121 points, placing Switzerland in fourth place out of 20. It was the seventh consecutive year that Switzerland had finished in the top 10. The Swiss jury awarded its 12 points to France.

The Swiss conductor at the contest was Rolf Zuckowski.

Voting

References

External links
 Swiss National Final 1981

1981
Countries in the Eurovision Song Contest 1981
Eurovision